Luck Nunatak is a nunatak  southwest of Mount Caywood, in the Behrendt Mountains of Ellsworth Land, Antarctica. It was mapped by the United States Geological Survey from surveys and U.S. Navy air photos, 1961–67, and was named by the Advisory Committee on Antarctic Names for George D. Luck, a crew member of the R4D aircraft party which established a base camp in the Eights Station vicinity in 1961.

References

Nunataks of Ellsworth Land